Sainte-Agathe-de-Lotbinière is a municipality in the Municipalité régionale de comté de Lotbinière in Quebec, Canada. Part of the Chaudière-Appalaches region, it had a population of 1,049 as of 2021.

It is named after Agatha of Sicily, who died as a martyr in 251.

Geography 
Sainte-Agathe-de-Lotbinière's territory, located at the foot of the Appalachian Mountains, is crossed by small water streams and presents a predominantly agricultural and forestry character. The territory mainly grows a mixed forest and is part of the hemiborated climatic zone.

The municipality covers 167.04 km squared of surface area, which is about 10% of the Lotbinière MRC territory.

In terms of distance, the citizens need to travel 30 km to get to the autoroute 20 highway at Laurier-Station and they are located at 45 minutes from Quebec City, 30 minutes from Sainte-Marie-de-Beauce and from Thetford Mines, the main surrounding cities.

History 
The initial development of Sainte-Agathe-de-Lotbinière is linked to the construction of the chemins Craig and Gosford roads in the mid-19th century.

The first road constructed within the lands was the Craig road (the road number 269 today) named this way in the honor of James Henry Craig, the governor of New-France at the time. The construction of this road started in August 1810 and as soon as 1811 people could make the Quebec-Boston trip in winter only, because in summer the road was too bumpy.

It is from this road that the first road leading to the territory that would form the Ste-Agathe parishes later was built. This road was named either Harvey Hill or Chemin des Mines for a long time, because it started from the Harvey Hill mine, located south of Craig road. This road passed through Craig to get to Ste-Agathe. Although the new constitution dates from 1743, following the amalgamation of the village and parish of Sainte-Agathe, the territory was opened to settlers in 1830.

This road was opened to prospectors to allow them to find deposits of copper or other metals. In those years, there had been many prospections in the surrounding areas with the aim to find important deposits. It was all abandoned and the Harvey Hill mine closed permanently in 1899.

Following the construction of this road, some settlers settled in the area and practiced agriculture.

It was mostly Irish people who settled along this road.

Some time later, another road opened, the Gosford road. This road was made to link the townships of Nelson, Inverness, Halifax, Wolfton, Ham, Weedon, Westbury and Ascot to Quebec City.

In those moments, the territory that would come to form the parishes of Ste-Agathe already had 63 families for 522 total individuals, of which 219 were french speakers and 303 were english speakers. 1 763 acres were under cultivation.

It is only some time later that there would be a road to Methot's Mill (Dosquet). It was the only location where people could receive merchandise and travel by train. There were pathways in the forest that made it possible to travel by foot or by horse, but not by car. It is in 1862 that construction began. The total cost was 41 pounds, 16 shillings, obtained from the government through MP Mr. H. Joly.

The fusion of the town with the parishes of Sainte-Agathe was done in 1999.

Demography 

The populations for 1861 and 1871, of around a thousand more people, can be explained by the fact that Lyster, Quebec used to be part of the Nelson Township until 1875, when it split up and became its own municipality. The Nelson Township was eventually united with the Sainte-Agathe parish in 1985.

Picture Gallery

References

External links
Commission de toponymie du Québec
Ministère des Affaires municipales, des Régions et de l'Occupation du territoire

Municipalities in Quebec
Incorporated places in Chaudière-Appalaches
1999 establishments in Quebec
Lotbinière Regional County Municipality
Canada geography articles needing translation from French Wikipedia